The Operation Faustschlag ("Operation Fist Punch"), also known as the Eleven Days' War, was a Central Powers offensive in World War I. It was the last major action on the Eastern Front.

Russian forces were unable to put up any serious resistance due to the turmoil of the Russian Revolution and subsequent Russian Civil War. The armies of the Central Powers therefore captured huge territories in Estonia, Latvia, Belarus, and Ukraine, forcing the Bolshevik government of Russia to sign the Treaty of Brest-Litovsk.

Background 
Bolsheviks took power in Russia during the October Revolution and announced that Russia would be withdrawing from war. Talks with the Central Powers started in Brest-Litovsk on 3 December 1917 and on the 17th a cease-fire went into effect. Peace talks soon followed, starting on 22 December.

As negotiations began, the Central Powers presented demands for the territory that they had occupied during the 1914–1916 period, including Poland, Lithuania and western Latvia. The Bolsheviks decided not to accept these terms and instead withdrew from the negotiations, eventually resulting in the breakdown of the ceasefire. Leon Trotsky, head of the Russian delegation, hoped to delay talks until a revolution occurred within Germany, which would force them out of the war.

Trotsky was the leading advocate of the "neither war nor peace" policy and on 28 January 1918 announced that Soviet Russia considered the war over. This was unacceptable to the Germans who were already transporting troops to the Western Front. The German Chief of Staff, general Max Hoffmann, responded by signing the peace treaty with Ukrainian People's Republic on 9 February and announced an end to the cease-fire with Russia in two-days time on 17 February, leading to the resumption of hostilities.

While negotiations were ongoing, Soviet Commander-in-Chief Nikolai Krylenko oversaw the demobilization and democratization of the Russian army, introducing elected commanders, ending all ranks, and sending troops home. On 29 January, Krylenko ordered demobilization of the whole army.

Offensive 

On 18 February, the German and Austro-Hungarian forces started a major three-pronged offensive against the Soviets with 53 divisions. The northern force advanced from Pskov towards Narva, the central force pushed towards Smolensk, and the southern force towards Kiev.

The northern force, consisting of 16 divisions, captured the key Daugavpils junction on the first day. This was soon followed by the capture of Pskov and securing Narva on 28 February. The central forces of the 10th Army and XLI corps advanced towards Smolensk. On 21 February Minsk was captured together with the headquarters of the Western Army Group. The Southern forces broke through the remains of the Russian Southwestern Army Group, capturing Zhitomir on 24 February. Kiev was secured on 2 March, one day after the Ukrainian Central Rada troops had arrived there.

Central Powers armies had advanced over  within a week, facing no serious Soviet resistance. German troops were now within  of Petrograd, forcing the Soviets to transfer their capital to Moscow. The rapid advance was described as a "Railway War" (der Eisenbahnfeldzug) with German soldiers using Russian railways to advance eastward. General Hoffmann wrote in his diary on 22 February:

It is the most comical war I have ever known. We put a handful of infantrymen with machine guns and one gun onto a train and rush them off to the next station; they take it, make prisoners of the Bolsheviks, pick up few more troops, and so on. This proceeding has, at any rate, the charm of novelty.Gilbert (2008), p. 399

Political impact 
As the German offensive was ongoing, Trotsky returned to Petrograd. Most of the leadership still preferred continuing the war, even though Russia was in no position to do so, due to the destruction of its army. At this point Lenin intervened to push the Soviet leadership into acceptance of German terms, which by now had become even harsher. He was backed by other senior communists to include Kamenev, Zinoviev, and Stalin.

After a stormy session of Lenin's ruling council, during which the revolution's leader went so far as to threaten resignation, he obtained a 116 to 85 vote in favour of the new German terms. The vote in the Central Committee was even closer, seven in favour and six against. In the end, Trotsky switched his vote and German terms were accepted; on 3 March, the Bolsheviks signed the Treaty of Brest-Litovsk.

On 24 February, one day before the arrival of German troops to Tallinn, the Estonian Salvation Committee declared the independence of Estonia. German occupation authorities refused to recognize the Estonian government and Germans were installed in positions of authority.

Aftermath 

The Bolshevik capitulation on 3 March only ended the advance along a line from Narva to Northern Ukraine, as with the Treaty of Brest-Litovsk the Soviet government gave up all rights to Southern Russia. During the next few months, the southern Central Powers forces advanced over 500 miles further, capturing the whole of Ukraine and some territory beyond.

German operations also continued in the Caucasus and Finland, where Germany assisted the White Finnish forces in the Finnish Civil War. Under the treaty all Russian naval bases in the Baltic except Kronstadt were taken away, and the Russian Black Sea Fleet warships in Odesa were to be disarmed and detained. The Bolsheviks also agreed to the immediate return of 630,000 Austrian prisoners-of-war.

With the Treaty of Brest-Litovsk, Soviet Russia had given up Estonia, Latvia, Lithuania, Poland, Belarus and Ukraine, enabling those territories to develop independently from Russian influence. Germany's intention was to turn these territories into political and territorial satellites, but this plan collapsed with Germany's own defeat within a year. After the German surrender, the Soviets made an attempt to regain lost territories. They were successful in some areas like Ukraine, Belarus and the Caucasus, but were forced to recognize the independence of the Baltic States, Finland, and Poland.

In Ukraine, Ukrainian troops took control of the Donets Basin in April 1918. In the same month, Crimea was also cleared of the Bolsheviks by Ukrainian troops and the Imperial German Army. On 13 March 1918 Ukrainian troops and the Austro-Hungarian Army had secured Odesa. On 5 April 1918 the German army took control of Yekaterinoslav, and 3 days later Kharkiv. The German/Austro-Hungarian victories in Ukraine were due to the apathy of the locals and the inferior fighting skills of Bolsheviks troops compared to their Austro-Hungarian and German counterparts.

In the Bolshevik government, Lenin consolidated his power; however, fearing the possibility of a renewed German threat along the Baltic, he moved the capital from Petrograd to Moscow on 12 March. Debates became far more restrained, and he was never again so strongly challenged as he was regarding the Brest-Litovsk treaty.

See also 
 Ober Ost
 Finnish Civil War
 German Caucasus expedition
 Soviet westward offensive of 1918–1919

References

Bibliography

1918 in Russia
Battles of the Eastern Front (World War I)
Battles of World War I involving Austria-Hungary
Battles of World War I involving Russia
Battles of World War I involving Germany
Conflicts in 1918
1918 in Belarus
February 1918 events
March 1918 events
Ukraine in World War I